Once and for All is the third live album by the Japanese band Loudness. It was released in 1994 and is the only live album with the formation that recorded the album Loudness in 1992. "House of 1.000 pleasures" is a song of the band Ezo, which singer Yamada was a member of before joining Loudness.

Track listing
"Pray for the Dead" - 4:53
"Slaughter House" - 4:48
"Down 'n' Dirty" - 5:44
"Everyone Lies" - 5:23
"House of 1.000 Pleasures" - 6:24
"Black Widow" - 5:29
"Twisted" - 10:09
"Waking the Dead" - 3:55
"Crazy Night" - 6:05
"S.D.I." - 6:10

Personnel
Loudness
Masaki Yamada - vocals
Akira Takasaki - guitars
Taiji Sawada - bass
Munetaka Higuchi - drums

References

1994 live albums
Loudness (band) live albums
Warner Music Group live albums